Peter Cholopi (born 19 August 1996) is a Malawian footballer who plays as a centre-back for Mighty Wanderers and the Malawi national team.

References

External links

1996 births
Living people
Malawian footballers
Malawi international footballers
People from Blantyre
Association football central defenders
Mighty Tigers FC players
Mighty Wanderers FC players
2021 Africa Cup of Nations players